Lindenbergia sokotrana is a species of plant in the family Orobanchaceae. It is endemic to Socotra.

References

sokotrana
Endemic flora of Socotra
Least concern plants
Taxonomy articles created by Polbot